The House of the Temple is a Masonic temple in Washington, D.C., United States that serves as the headquarters of the Scottish Rite of Freemasonry, Southern Jurisdiction, U.S.A. (officially, Home of The Supreme Council, 33°, Ancient & Accepted Scottish Rite of Freemasonry, Southern Jurisdiction, Washington D.C., U.S.A.)

Designed by John Russell Pope, it stands at 1733 16th Street, N.W., in the Dupont Circle neighborhood, about one mile directly north of the White House.  The full name of the Supreme Council is "The Supreme Council (Mother Council of the World) of the Inspectors General Knights Commander of the House of the Temple of Solomon of the Thirty-third degree of the Ancient and Accepted Scottish Rite of Freemasonry of the Southern Jurisdiction of the United States of America."  It was modeled after the tomb of Mausolus at Halicarnassus.

It contains multiple museum rooms devoted to various subject matters which change on a rotating basis. The Temple also holds a permanent large collection of materials related to Scottish poet and Freemason Robert Burns, one of the world’s largest, in its library holdings, which Library was the first public library in Washington, D.C.

History
On May 31, 1911, 110 years after the founding of the Supreme Council, Grand Commander James D. Richardson broke ground on the spot where the House of the Temple now stands in Washington, D.C. Grand Master J. Claude Keiper, of the Grand Lodge of the District of Columbia, laid the cornerstone in the northeast corner on October 18, 1911.

The temple was designed by architect John Russell Pope, who modeled it after the tomb of Mausolus at Halicarnassus, one of the Seven Wonders of the Ancient World. The building was dedicated four years later on October 18, 1915.

The building's design was widely praised by contemporary architects, and it won Pope the Gold Medal of the Architectural League of New York in 1917. In his 1920 book L'Architecture aux États-Unis, French architect Jacques Gréber described it as "a monument of remarkable sumptuousness ... the ensemble is an admirable study of antique architecture stamped with a powerful dignity." Fiske Kimball's 1928 book American Architecture describes it as "an example of the triumph of classical form in America". In the 1920s, a panel of architects named it "one of the three best public buildings" in the United States, along with the Nebraska State Capitol and the Pan American Union Building in Washington, D.C. In 1932, it was ranked as one of the ten top buildings in the country in a poll of federal government architects.

Confederate general and former Sovereign Grand Commander Albert Pike was the author of an 1871 book called Morals and Dogma of the Ancient and Accepted Scottish Rite of Freemasonry, a book that describes in detail the 33 degrees of Scottish Rite Freemasonry, the stories and teachings associated with each rank, the rituals connected to each rank, and other lodge proceedings.  In 1944, the remains of Albert Pike were removed from Oak Hill Cemetery in Georgetown and placed in the House of the Temple. The remains of Past Grand Commander John Henry Cowles were entombed in the temple in 1952, after his 31-year reign as Grand Commander.  The Temple also holds one of the largest collections of materials related to Scottish poet and Freemason Robert Burns in its library, the first public library in Washington, D.C.

The House of the Temple is designated as a contributing property to the Sixteenth Street Historic District, listed on the National Register of Historic Places in 1978.

From 1990 to 2011, the temple hosted a community garden on its grounds. In fall 2011, the Temple closed the garden in order to use the space to stage construction equipment for a rehabilitation project.

In popular culture
In the 2009 novel The Lost Symbol by Dan Brown, the building is the setting for several key scenes.

See also

 List of Masonic buildings
 List of museums in Washington, D.C.
 National Museum of Women in the Arts, a nearby building that was a Masonic temple
 Julius Lansburgh Furniture Co., Inc., an office building that was a Masonic temple

References

External links

 Supreme Council, Scottish Rite official website 
 House of the Temple, virtual tour
 "Inside the House of the Temple", photo gallery by U.S. News & World Report
12 photos
Smithsonian magazine

Dupont Circle
Historic district contributing properties in Washington, D.C.
History museums in Washington, D.C.
John Russell Pope buildings
Masonic buildings completed in 1915
Masonic buildings in Washington, D.C.
Masonic museums in the United States
Neoclassical architecture in Washington, D.C.
Public libraries in Washington, D.C.
Clubhouses on the National Register of Historic Places in Washington, D.C.